Bárbaro Julio Morgan Soroa (4 December 1951 – January 2018) was a heavyweight wrestler from Cuba, who competed in freestyle and Greco-Roman wrestling, winning a bronze medal at the 1978 World Championships in men's freestyle. He competed in men's freestyle at the 1972, 1976 and 1980 Summer Olympics and placed fifth-eighth. Morgan won three silver medals in freestyle wrestling at the Pan American Games in 1971–1979 and a gold medal in sambo in 1983 – the only year when sambo tournament was held at those games.

References

External links
 

1951 births
2018 deaths
Olympic wrestlers of Cuba
Wrestlers at the 1972 Summer Olympics
Wrestlers at the 1976 Summer Olympics
Wrestlers at the 1980 Summer Olympics
Cuban male sport wrestlers
Pan American Games gold medalists for Cuba
Pan American Games silver medalists for Cuba
Pan American Games medalists in wrestling
Wrestlers at the 1971 Pan American Games
Wrestlers at the 1975 Pan American Games
Wrestlers at the 1979 Pan American Games
Wrestlers at the 1983 Pan American Games
Sambokas at the 1983 Pan American Games
Cuban sambo practitioners
World Wrestling Championships medalists
Central American and Caribbean Games medalists in wrestling
Central American and Caribbean Games gold medalists for Cuba
Competitors at the 1974 Central American and Caribbean Games
Competitors at the 1978 Central American and Caribbean Games
Medalists at the 1971 Pan American Games
Medalists at the 1975 Pan American Games
Medalists at the 1979 Pan American Games
Medalists at the 1983 Pan American Games
People from Florida, Cuba
20th-century Cuban people